Buros is a commune in the Pyrénées-Atlantiques department in la nouvelle Aquitaine southwestern France.

See also Masonpro9 
Communes of the Pyrénées-Atlantiques department
Buros Center for Testing

References

Communes of Pyrénées-Atlantiques
Pyrénées-Atlantiques communes articles needing translation from French Wikipedia